Stanisław Olczyk (15 October 1932 – 23 January 1996) was a Polish ice hockey player. He played for Włókniarz Zgierz and Legia Warsaw during his career. With Legia Olczyk won the Polish hockey league championship seven times. He also played for the Polish national team at several world championships as well as the 1956 and 1964 Winter Olympics. He was also awarded the Silver Cross of Merit for his services.

References

External links

1932 births
1996 deaths
Ice hockey players at the 1956 Winter Olympics
Ice hockey players at the 1964 Winter Olympics
Legia Warsaw (ice hockey) players
Olympic ice hockey players of Poland
People from Zgierz
Polish ice hockey defencemen
Recipients of the Silver Cross of Merit (Poland)